Federico Della Valle, (born , Asti, Piedmont [Italy]—died 1628, Milan), was an Italian baroque dramatist and poet, recognized only in the 20th century as one of the greatest Italian tragedian of the seventeenth century.

His fame, as a writer, non-existent in his lifetime, was just as dim after his death. He was mentioned occasionally but inaccurately by scholars in succeeding centuries, until in 1929 Benedetto Croce read his Queen of Scots play and made the first of many influential and brilliant rediscoveries and revaluations. Since Croce's discovery and reappraisal of Della Valle, the dramatist has been hailed by critics as one of the most gifted Italian tragedian of the century, and the bibliography on his works has become very extensive.

Life 
Little is known of Della Valle's life. He was born about 1560 near Asti in Piedmont, entered the court of Savoy and was employed there certainly in 1587, and for some time afterwards. As a courtier, he composed an epithalamium for the royal wedding, intermezzi for official occasions, and sonnets and madrigals in honor of nobles and prelates. His patron was the Infanta Caterina, daughter of King Philip II of Spain and wife to Charles Emmanuel I, and she probably commissioned him the one and only work staged in his lifetime, the tragicomedy Adelonda di Frigia, which was based on Iphigenia in Tauris by Euripides. When she died in 1597, Della Valle's fortune, never very promising, declined and he departed to Milan in the service of Spain. When he died in 1628, three of his plays had already been published, though they had never been performed, and the only other to survive was published in the year after his death.

Works 
Della Valle's masterpiece is considered to be the intensely lyrical La Reina di Scotia (“The Queen of Scotland”), called Maria la reina in its first version (1591). The tragedy centres on Mary Stuart’s last hours, when, despite her longing to see again her native Scotland, she resigns herself to martyrdom. Unlike the later tragedy of moral error by Friedrich Schiller on the same subject, Della Valle's play presents Mary Stuart as a saint sacrificed by the agents of a heretical religion. Against similar backgrounds of corrupt and ferocious courts, the biblical heroines of his other two tragedies, Iudit (“Judith”) and Ester (“Esther”), also fight uncompromisingly for their faith in a world where the only redemption is offered by God in Heaven. Though written some time earlier – Iudit as early as the late 1590s – these two tragedies were published together as a single volume in 1627. Della Valle’s tragic outlook also underlies his tragicomedy Adelonda di Frigia (1595; “Adelonda of Phrygia”), in which the heroine’s ideals are contrasted with a barbarous reality.

Della Valle follows the model of Greek tragedy: cast in the canonical five acts, the dramas feature a series of speaking characters and a chorus; no violence is shown onstage. Thus, for example, the execution of Mary of Scotland is narrated to her nurses by the steward who accompanied her to the gallows.

Main works

Notes

Bibliography 
 
 Getto, Giovanni, Il teatro barocco di Federico Della Valle, « Il Verri », II, 1958.

External links
 
 

17th-century Italian poets
17th-century Italian dramatists and playwrights
1560s births
1628 deaths
People from Asti
Italian male poets
Italian male dramatists and playwrights